SalfaCorp  is the largest and one of the most important Chilean companies in the sector of construction and real estate and is an international company with offices in Santiago, Chile; Buenos Aires, Argentina; Bogota, Colombia; Lima, Peru; Shanghai, China and Petaling Jaya, Malaysia.

SalfaCorp leads the industrial assembly and civil work market in Chile. The company  operates in two business units: engineering and construction and property development. Engineering and construction is engaged in civil works, industrial assembly, new businesses such as industrial support, maritime works and, tunnels. Property development is engaged in the execution of all related activities from the design and coordination of projects including construction, marketing and after sales.

Aconcagua Inmobiliaria is a corporation from SalfaCorp, it has projects from Antofagasta to Puerto Montt. Is one of the most important Corporation.

References 

Real estate companies of Chile
Chilean companies established in 1929
Construction and civil engineering companies established in 1929
Real estate companies established in 1929